Crashes is the second album by the British power pop band the Records, released in 1980 by Virgin Records.

Reception 

Crashes did not chart in the United Kingdom. In the United States, it "bubbled under" the Billboard 200 album chart at number 204. Rolling Stone published a favourable review of the album upon its initial release.

Retrospectively, Trouser Press called the album a "passable, but hardly a great follow-up" to Shades in Bed.

Track listing 
All songs written by Will Birch and John Wicks except where noted.

UK release
Side one
 "Rumour Sets the Woods Alight" – 3:02
 "Hearts in Her Eyes" – 3:20
 "I Don't Remember Your Name" – 3:35
 "Man with a Girlproof Heart" (Birch, Richie Bull) – 2:46
 "The Same Mistakes" – 4:15

Side two
 "Girl in Golden Disc" – 3:43
 "Spent a Week with You Last Night" – 3:10
 "Hearts Will Be Broken" – 3:45
 "The Worriers" – 3:25
 "Guitars in the Sky" – 4:05

US release
Side one
 "Man with a Girlproof Heart" (Birch, Bull) – 2:47
 "Hearts Will Be Broken" – 3:52
 "Girl in Golden Disc" – 3:47
 "I Don't Remember Your Name" – 3:38
 "Hearts in Her Eyes" – 3:20

Side two
 "Spent a Week with You Last Night" – 3:09
 "Rumour Sets the Woods Alight" – 3:06
 "The Worriers" – 3:29
 "The Same Mistakes" – 4:15
 "Guitars in the Sky" – 4:08

2004 CD release
 "Hearts in Her Eyes" – 3:21
 "Girl in Golden Disc" – 3:44
 "Rumour Sets the Woods Alight" – 3:04
 "I Don't Remember Your Name" – 3:33
 "The Same Mistakes" – 4:12
 "Man with a Girlproof Heart" (Birch, Bull) – 2:48
 "Hearts Will Be Broken" – 3:48
 "Spent a Week with You Last Night" – 3:11
 "The Worriers" – 3:28
 "Guitars in the Sky" – 4:14
 "Injury Time" – 3:08
 "Vamp" – 3:11
 "So Sorry" – 2:50
 "Faces at the Window" – 3:39
 "The Same Mistakes" (1979) - 4:00
 "Man with a Girlproof Heart" (1979) (Birch, Bull) – 3:02

Personnel 
 John Wicks – guitar, vocals
 Phil Brown – bass, vocals
 Jude Cole – guitar, vocals
 Will Birch – drums

References

External links 
 

1980 albums
The Records albums
Albums produced by Craig Leon
Virgin Records albums